Valeriy Aleksandrovich Abramov (22 August 1956, Yertsevo, Arkhangelsk Oblast, Russia – 14 September 2016, Moscow, Russia) was a long-distance runner from the Soviet Union. Honoured master of sports of USSR. He trained under the direction of Leonid Beliaev (Honoured coach of the USSR and Russia).

Career

Eleven-time champion of the USSR: 1976 – 1500 m (juniors); 1978 – 1500 m, 4 × 800 m (relay race), 3000 m (hall); 1979 – 5000 m; 1981 – 3000 m (hall), 8000 m (cross); 1982 – 3000 m (hall), 1983 – 1500 m, 3000 m (hall); 1987 - 10,000 m.

Winner of the Spartakiad of Peoples of the USSR in 1979 at the distance of 5000 meters.

In 1981 he won the USA-USSR match, representing the USSR national team.

In 1984 at Friendship Games (the Druzhba-84) tournament (an alternative to the Summer Olympic Games in 1984 in Los Angeles), he won the 10,000 meters distance with a result 27:55.17.

He set up  several records of the USSR: 
1979 – 5000 m (result - 13.15,6) in Sochi; 
September 9, 1981 at the Grand Prix of Rieti set a record of the USSR at a distance of 5000 meters - 13.11.99. This result is still a record in Russia. 
1982 – 5000 m (result - 13.35,7; hall) in Milan; 
1983 - mile (1609 m) (result - 3.58.63; hall) in Oxford. 
From 1984 to 2008 he owned the record of Russia in the run for 10,000 meters - 27.55,17.

Winner of three European Indoor Championships: 1981 - 3rd place at a distance of 3000 m, Grenoble; 1982 - 3rd place at a distance of 3000 m, Milan; 1983 - 2nd place at a distance of 3000 m, Budapest.

Took second place at the 5000m distance at the World Cup in Montreal in 1979.

European Cup: 1981 - 2nd place at the 5000 m distance in Zagreb; 1983 - 3rd place at a distance of 10,000 m in London.

Achievements

References

External links
 1981 Year List

 He also competed in the men's 5000 metres at the 1980 Summer Olympics.|

1956 births
2016 deaths
Soviet male long-distance runners
Russian male long-distance runners
Place of birth missing
Athletes (track and field) at the 1980 Summer Olympics
Olympic athletes of the Soviet Union
Friendship Games medalists in athletics